James Harper (March 28, 1780March 31, 1873) was an Irish-American politician who served as a National Republican member of the U.S. House of Representatives for Pennsylvania's 2nd congressional district from 1833 to 1837.

He owned a brick manufacturing business, a wholesale grocery trade and developed the Philadelphia neighborhood now known as Rittenhouse Square.

Biography
Harper was born on March 28, 1780 in Castlederg, County Tyrone in Ireland.  As a youth, he immigrated to the United States with his parents, and settled in Philadelphia.  He rose to prominence in commerce through the manufacture of brick and from 1820 to 1830 in the wholesale grocery trade. He married Charlotte Sloan Alford, a member of an established Pennsylvania Quaker family.  He was a Freemason, and was elected to the position of Grand Master of Pennsylvania in 1824. As Grand Master, he hosted fellow mason the Marquis de Lafayette during the latter's "Farewell Tour" of the United States in 1825.

In 1832 Harper was elected to the United States Congress as a National Republican (Anti-Jacksonian), and represented Pennsylvania's Second Congressional District in the Twenty-third and Twenty-fourth Congresses.  His letters from Washington, some of which are preserved in the Historical Society of Pennsylvania, reflect a disgust with the endemic corruption of Andrew Jackson and his administration.  He chose not to stand for reelection in 1836.  In Congress he allied himself with Henry Clay, and followed Clay in commissioning his portrait from the Philadelphia painter John Neagle.

Upon his retirement from Congress, Harper continued in the manufacture of brick, and branched out into real estate speculation and urban development.  He bought the north side of Philadelphia's then undeveloped Rittenhouse Square and built a fine house for himself at 1811 Walnut Street in around 1840.  His mansion set a patrician residential tone for the square and he sold off the remaining lots at profit.  The front part of his house, sold after his death to the Social Art Club (an exclusive men's club that renamed itself the Rittenhouse Club), still stands behind the 1901 facade that the club added.

In Philadelphia Harper was a member of the Board of Guardians of the Poor and of the Board of Prison Inspectors.  A patron of science, Harper was one of the founders of the Franklin Institute in 1824, and a delegate to the Great Exhibition of the Works of Industry of all Nations (often called the "Crystal Palace Exhibition") in London in 1851. Harper was a pewholder at St. Stephen's Episcopal Church. He died in Philadelphia on March 31, 1873 and was interred in Laurel Hill Cemetery.

Legacy
The Harper, a 24-story luxury apartment and Harper's Garden, a bar and restaurant, both in the Rittenhouse Square neighborhood of Philadelphia, were named in his honor.

Of his ten children, eight survived to adulthood and several of those entered public life: Alexander J. Harper was President of the Philadelphia City Council, Benjamin West Harper (named after Charlotte Harper's relative Benjamin West) was a businessman and lieutenant colonel in the Pennsylvania National Guard, and Thomas Scott Harper was a physician and president of the Medical Board of Philadelphia.

Citations

External links
The Political Graveyard

1780 births
1873 deaths
19th-century American businesspeople
19th-century American politicians
American grocers
American people of Scotch-Irish descent
Brick manufacturers
Burials at Laurel Hill Cemetery (Philadelphia)
Businesspeople from Philadelphia
Irish emigrants to the United States (before 1923)
Masonic Grand Masters
National Republican Party members of the United States House of Representatives from Pennsylvania
People from Castlederg
Politicians from Philadelphia
Real estate and property developers
Rittenhouse Square, Philadelphia